Joseph ''Joe'' Addo (born 21 September 1971 in Accra) is a former Ghanaian Association football defender and one-time captain of the Ghana national team.

Career 
Addo went to the United States to attend college and play soccer at George Mason University where he was a 1992 First Team All American. On the club level, Addo played for Cagliari in Italy, VfB Stuttgart and FSV Frankfurt in Germany, Sparta Rotterdam in the Netherlands, Belenenses in Portugal, Ethnikos Piraeus in Greece, Tampa Bay Mutiny, MetroStars in the United States and Kitchee in Hong Kong.

Joseph Addo features in the book The Miracle of Castel di Sangro by Joe McGinniss where it seems a transfer for Joseph from FSV Frankfurt to A.S.D. Castel di Sangro Calcio had been agreed, only for the Castel di Sangro's owners to pull out. Joe McGinniss' account asserts that he, the club owners and members of the Castel di Sangro playing staff were unhappy about this, and that the collapse of the transfer was entirely because coach Osvaldo Jaconi did not want Addo in his squad.

International career 
Addo played for Ghana at the 1996 Summer Olympics. For the senior team, he appeared 44 times, scoring two goals.

Personal life
Joe is married to Cynthia Addo and has two children.

References 

2. The Miracle of Castel di Sangro by Joe McGinniss published by Sphere in 1999, copyright retained by author

External links 
Addo at GhanaWeb.com

1971 births
Living people
Ghanaian footballers
Ghana international footballers
VfB Stuttgart players
VfB Stuttgart II players
FSV Frankfurt players
Ethnikos Piraeus F.C. players
Tampa Bay Mutiny players
New York Red Bulls players
Kitchee SC players
C.F. Os Belenenses players
Olympic footballers of Ghana
Footballers at the 1996 Summer Olympics
Footballers from Accra
Ghanaian expatriate sportspeople in Hong Kong
Hong Kong First Division League players
Expatriate footballers in Germany
Expatriate footballers in Hong Kong
George Mason University alumni
George Mason Patriots men's soccer players
Accra Hearts of Oak S.C. players
1996 African Cup of Nations players
Ghanaian expatriate sportspeople in the United States
Major League Soccer players
Association football central defenders
All-American men's college soccer players